The vice president of Turkmenistan, formally referred to as the deputy chairman of the Cabinet of Ministers, and erroneously (based on the official title, and despite the abolition of the prime minister of Turkmenistan's office) as the deputy prime minister, is the deputy head of state and deputy chairman of the government, though, anomalously, not the immediate constitutional successor. The vice president is appointed by the president of Turkmenistan.

First vice presidents

References

Politics of Turkmenistan
Government of Turkmenistan
Vice-presidents of Turkmenistan
Turkmenistan